Swedish singer Agnes has released five studio albums, one compilation album, one extended play, 19 singles and 15 music videos.

Agnes' debut studio album, Agnes, was released in Sweden in December 2005 by Columbia Records, topping the Swedish Albums Chart and earning a platinum certification. The first single, "Right Here Right Now", also topped the charts in Sweden. The second and final single from the album, "Stranded", did not fare as well, peaking at number 27. The following year, she released her second studio album, Stronger, which also topped the Swedish chart. The two singles released followed a similar pattern as her debut—"Kick Back Relax" peaked at number two and "Champion" at number 19.

In 2009, Agnes released her third studio album, Dance Love Pop. The first single, "Release Me", peaked at number nine in Sweden and was released as Agnes' international debut. The song reached the top five in the United Kingdom, Germany and Switzerland, and the top 10 in many other countries. "On and On" was the second single in selected countries and peaked at number eight in Sweden and 16 in Denmark. "Love Love Love" and "I Need You Now" were also released in Sweden, peaking at numbers four and 10, respectively. In 2012, Agnes topped the DigiListan chart with "One Last Time".

In 2021, Agnes released her fifth studio album, Magic Still Exists. It peaked at number seven in Sweden.

Albums

Studio albums

Compilation albums

Extended plays

Singles

As lead artist

As featured artist

Other charted songs

Music videos

Notes

References

External links
 
 
 
 

Discography
Discographies of Swedish artists
Pop music discographies